Harper is an unincorporated community in St. Clair County, in the U.S. state of Missouri.

History
A post office called Harper was established in 1891, and remained in operation until 1917. The community has the name of H. G. Harper, a pioneer citizen who secured the town a post office.

The Harper School was added to the National Register of Historic Places in 2007.

References

Unincorporated communities in St. Clair County, Missouri
Unincorporated communities in Missouri